was a town located in Toyoura District, Yamaguchi Prefecture, Japan.

As of January 31, 2005, the town had an estimated population of 12,740 and a density of 75.56 persons per km². The total area is 168.61 km².

On February 13, 2005, Hōhoku, along with the towns of Kikugawa, Toyoura and Toyota (all from Toyoura District), was merged into the expanded city of Shimonoseki.

Famous Residents 
 Masaaki Ikenaga: Former baseball player for the Nishitetsu Lions.
 SION: Singer-songwriter
 Kikusha Tagami: Edo-period poet
 Taichi Nakayama: Founder of Nakayama Taiyoudou Cosmetics (now Club Cosmetics Co.,Ltd)
 Kiyoshi Sasabe: Film director
 Keiko Umeda: Announcer
 Ryuji Fujita: Japanese artist
 Kumiko Sakino: Volleyball player
 Masami Yamamoto: President of Fujitsu Ltd
 Shouzan Sasaki: Member of the Imperial Diet
 Saburo Akieda: Lieutenant in the Imperial Japanese Navy, and a member of the 8th Submarine Squadron
 Tagami Kikusha: Poet

External links
 
 Life Accessory - A Guide To Hōhoku 
 Shimonoseki official website 
 Shimonoseki official website 
 Shimonoseki Commerce and Industry Association - Hōhoku Branch 

Dissolved municipalities of Yamaguchi Prefecture